Maxwell Bolus (26 June 1890 – 19 January 1956) was a South African cricketer. He played in three first-class matches for Eastern Province in 1924/25 and 1925/26.

See also
 List of Eastern Province representative cricketers

References

External links
 

1890 births
1956 deaths
South African cricketers
Eastern Province cricketers
Cricketers from Cape Town